Harold Frank Neary (6 March 1921 – 17 November 2004) was an English footballer who played as a striker, mainly for Millwall, Leyton Orient and West Ham United.

Career
During World War II Neary played as an amateur for West Ham United, Finchley and then Fulham, before joining the Army. While stationed in Ireland he played for Glentoran. After the war he joined Queens Park Rangers (QPR) and featured in 30 regional wartime matches, scoring 23 goals.

When regular football recommenced in 1946–47, Neary continued with QPR before moving to West Ham for £4,000 in January 1947. His time there was curtailed after reportedly hitting an opponent who had fouled him, out of sight of the referee. West Ham sold him at a £2,000 loss in November 1947 to Leyton Orient, where he became the club's record goalscorer at that time, with 25 goals during the 1948–49 season. He was noted for the power of his shooting, and once knocked out opposing goalkeeper Archie McFeat of Torquay United, who got in the way of a Neary drive.

Refusing advances from Newcastle United, Neary moved back to QPR for £7,000 in October 1949, but it was a further move in August 1950, this time to Millwall for £6,000, which led him to 50 more league goals in 123 league appearances.

Neary finished his career playing non-league football at Gravesend in May 1954. He died at St Raphael's Hospice in North Cheam on 17 November 2004, aged 83.

References

1921 births
2004 deaths
Sportspeople from Aldershot
English footballers
Association football forwards
Queens Park Rangers F.C. players
West Ham United F.C. players
Leyton Orient F.C. players
Millwall F.C. players
Ebbsfleet United F.C. players
English Football League players
Footballers from Hampshire